César Charlone (born February 20, 1950) is a Uruguayan film director, screenwriter, actor and cinematographer. He was born in Montevideo but lives in Brazil. In 2003, he was nominated for the Academy Award for Best Cinematography for his work on the highly acclaimed film City of God. On 2007, he directed his first feature film, The Pope's Toilet, which was selected by Uruguay as its official submission for the 80th Academy Award for Best Foreign Language Film. A year earlier, he was invited to join the Academy of Motion Picture Arts and Sciences.

Filmography

Feature films

Documentary films

TV series

References

External links 
 

Brazilian cinematographers
1958 births
Living people
Brazilian film directors
Brazilian screenwriters
Brazilian male actors
Uruguayan emigrants to Brazil
People from Montevideo